Deividas is a Lithuanian masculine given name. Individuals with the name Deividas include:
Deividas Česnauskis (born 1981), Lithuanian footballer 
Deividas Dulkys (born 1988), Lithuanian basketball player
Deividas Gailius (born 1988), Lithuanian basketball player
Deividas Kumelis (born 1995), Lithuanian basketball player
Deividas Matulionis (born 1963), Lithuanian politician and diplomat
Deividas Pukis (born 1992), Lithuanian basketball player
Deividas Šemberas (born 1978), Lithuanian footballer
Deividas Sirvydis (born 2000), Lithuanian basketball player
Deividas Stagniūnas (born 1985), Lithuanian ice dancer
Deividas Taurosevičius (born 1977), Lithuanian mixed martial artist
  

Lithuanian masculine given names